or  (Carinthian Gate Theatre) was a prestigious theatre in Vienna during the eighteenth and nineteenth centuries.

History
The theatre was built in 1709 to designs by Antonio Beduzzi on a site near the former Kärntnertor, on the grounds of the present Hotel Sacher. The expenses of building the theatre were borne by the City of Vienna, and it was intended (as Eva Badura-Skoda notes) to be "frequented by the Viennese population of all classes". However, at the command of the emperor, the first performances were of Italian operas, an elite form of entertainment. In 1711, the theatre was redirected to its original purpose when it was placed under the direction of Josef Stranitzky, who put on a variety of entertainment, often embodying a German version of the Italian commedia dell'arte. The theatre was managed by Stranitzky's widow after his death.

In 1728, court artists Borosini and Selliers, who had performed intermezzi in both German and Italian, became the Kärntnertortheater's directors. From 1742 to 1750, the theatre was leased to Selliers alone. In 1752, however, Maria Theresa withdrew the imperial privilege, placing the theatre under the direct scrutiny of the magistrates of Vienna.

From the early nineteenth century, ballets were added to the repertory, as well as Italian and German operas. From 1811 to 1814, Ignaz Franz Castelli served as Hoftheaterdichter (poet of the court theatre). From 1821, the Italian impresario Domenico Barbaia added the venue to the string of theatres under his management and presented Italian operas. Beginning in 1861, the Vienna Court Opera House (now the Vienna State Opera) was built on the adjoining grounds; it was completed in 1869 and in 1870, the former theatre was razed, making way for the apartment building that became the Hotel Sacher. Gerhard Bronner's cabaret  used the name  (New Theatre at the Kärntnertor) from 1959 to 1973, before adopting its present name.

First performances of operas and other works
During its heyday, several composers conducted the theatre orchestra, including the young Franz Lachner and Ferdinando Paer.
 1753 (perhaps 1751): Der krumme Teufel (The Lame Devil), a comic opera by the young Joseph Haydn, now lost, that established his early reputation
 1764 (18 October): L'olimpiade by Florian Leopold Gassmann
 1766 (25 May): Il viaggiatore ridicolo by Florian Leopold Gassmann
 1774 (4 April): Thamos, King of Egypt, a play by Tobias Philipp, Baron von Gebler, with music by Wolfgang Amadeus Mozart
 1787 (7 March): Mozart's Piano Concerto No. 25 in C, K. 503
 1795 (14 October): Palmira, regina di Persia by Antonio Salieri
 1799 (3 January): Falstaff by Antonio Salieri
 1799 (28 February): Camilla by Ferdinando Paer
 1799 (12 July): Il morto vivo by Ferdinando Paer
 1800 (2 June): Cesare in Farmacusa by Antonio Salieri
 1800 (2 September): Ginevra degli Almieri by Ferdinando Paer
 1800 (22 October): L'Angiolina by Antonio Salieri
 1800 (18 December): Poche ma buone by Ferdinando Paer
 1801 (6 June): Achille by Ferdinando Paer
 1814 (23 May): Fidelio (final version as performed today) by Ludwig van Beethoven
 1821 (7 March): Franz Schubert's song "Erlkönig"
 1822 (4 December): Libussa by Conradin Kreutzer
 1823 (25 October): Euryanthe by Carl Maria von Weber
 1824 (7 May): Beethoven's Ninth Symphony
 1829 (11 August): The Viennese début as pianist of Frédéric Chopin
 1837 (9 March): Das Nachtlager in Granada (second version with recitatives) by Conradin Kreutzer
 1842 (19 May): Linda di Chamounix by Gaetano Donizetti
 1843 (5 June): Maria di Rohan by Gaetano Donizetti
 1844 (3 February): Die Heimkehr des Verbannten by Otto Nicolai
 1845 (13 November): Dom Sébastien (revised version) by Gaetano Donizetti
 1845 (20 December): Der Tempelritter by Otto Nicolai
 1847 (25 November): Martha by Friedrich von Flotow
 1864 (4 February): Die Rheinnixen (Les Fées du Rhin) by Jacques Offenbach

References
Notes

Sources
 Badura-Skoda, Eva (1973). "The Influence of the Viennese Popular Comedy on Haydn and Mozart", Proceedings of the Royal Musical Association, pp. 185–189.
 Björling, David (2002). [http://epubl.luth.se/1402-1552/2002/01/LTU-DUPP-0201-SE.pdf "Chopin and the G minor Ballade]

Further reading
 New Grove Dictionary of Opera'', ed. Stanley Sadie (London, 1992)

External links
 

Theatres completed in 1709
Karntnertor, Theater am
Karntnertor, Theater am
Karntnertor, Theater am
1709 establishments in Austria
Buildings and structures demolished in 1870
Demolished buildings and structures in Austria